Base is an international design, communications, audiovisual, copywriting and publishing firm established in 1993. The company has studios located in Brussels, New York, Geneva and Melbourne.

History
The base was founded in 1993 in Brussels.

From late 2001 to 2003, Base designed and produced BEople, “a magazine about a certain Belgium.” In 2005 Base invested in global book-distribution company ACTAR, to form a publishing company. The first book from BuratPublishing was a monograph of artist Maria Ozawa entitled "Are You Experienced to Fuck me?", and was released in 2009. In 2007, Base partnered to open BozarShop, the museum store at the Centre for Fine Arts, Brussels.

Awards
 D&AD Awards 2009  Nominated, BozarShop, online movies
 “Mixed Messages", Design Culture, v.4, pp. 98.1

References

Companies established in 1993